The year 1990 in American television involved some significant events. Below is a list of American television-related events during 1990.

Notable events

Programs

Debuts
The following is a list of shows that premiered in 1990.

Entering syndication this year
A list of programs (current or canceled) that have accumulated enough episodes (between 65 and 100) or seasons (3 or more) to be eligible for off-network syndication and/or basic cable runs.

Changes of network affiliation
The following shows aired new episodes on a different network than previous first-run episodes:

Returning this year

Ending this year

Made-for-TV movies

Television stations

Station launches

Network affiliation changes

Station closures

Births

Deaths

See also
 1990 in the United States
 List of American films of 1990

References

External links 
List of 1990 American television series at IMDb

 
1990s in American television